This is a list of banks headquartered in Scotland.

Banks in Scotland 

 Adam and Company
 Bank of Scotland
 Clydesdale Bank
 Royal Bank of Scotland
 Sainsbury's Bank
 Tesco Bank
 TSB Bank

Former banks 

 Airdrie Savings Bank

 British Linen Bank
 City of Glasgow Bank
 Commercial Bank of Scotland
 Douglas, Heron & Company
 Glasgow and Ship Bank
 Leith Banking Company
 National Bank of Scotland
 National Commercial Bank of Scotland

Banknotes 

 Banknotes of Scotland

 Banknotes of the pound sterling

See also 

 Chartered Institute of Bankers in Scotland

 Scottish bankers

Lists of banks by country
Lists of companies of the United Kingdom by industry
Lists of banks in Europe